Antonis Martasidis (born June 14, 1992) is a Greek/Cypriot male weightlifter, competing in the 85 kg category. Martasidis was originally on the entry list to represent Cyprus at the 2016 Summer Olympics, but was immediately ejected from the Games after testing positive for a banned substance on July 25.

Major results

References

External links

1992 births
Living people
Greek male weightlifters
Place of birth missing (living people)
Cypriot male weightlifters
Doping cases in weightlifting
Competitors at the 2022 Mediterranean Games
Sportspeople from Kavala